Anubrata Chatterjee (born 1 June 1985) is an eminent Indian tabla player of the Farukhabad gharana of Hindustani classical music. He is the son of world-renowned tabla maestro, Pt. Anindo Chatterjee.

Early life and education 
Son of the world-renowned tabla maestro, Pt. Anindo Chatterjee, Anubrata Chatterjee was nurtured from a very tender age to be a tabla player. He had the rare fortune of being the youngest and the last "Ganda-Bandh" disciple of the great guru, Padmabhushan - Deshkottam Jnan Prakash Ghosh in 1992. Subsequently, Anubrata continued his training under the gifted tutelage of his father focusing on Farukhabad Gharana along with Lucknow & Ajrada Gharana styles.
He made his debut as an accompanying artist with the legendary Pt. Hari Prasad Chaurasia and since then, has gone on to successfully accompany living legends of Indian Classical Music such as Ustad Amjad Ali Khan, Pandit Birju Maharaj, Pt.Shiv Kumar Sharma, Ustad Shahid Parvez, Sh. T.H.Vikku Vinayakram, and other respected musicians all over the world.
Anubrata has proved himself both as a soloist and as an accompanist, by  his consummate tabla renditions. He has also given numerous memorable duet performances along with his father. Taking the ‘parampara’ forward, he has built upon his father's style and expanded his own repertoire to display an amalgamation of power, grace, skill, and superb tonal clarity.
Internationally, he marked his debut with a solo performance at the B.B.C. World Radio, U.K. in the year 1991. Since then he has performed worldwide.
Anubrata has been invited to perform at some of the most prestigious International festivals held across the globe, such as : The Carnegie Hall, The Kennedy Centre Of Performing Arts, Washington DC; The Esplanade Theatres, Singapore; World Percussion Festival, Chicago; The Jerash festival, Jordan; Corfu festival, Greece; Dubrovnic Festival, Croatia; Namaste India Festival, Japan; Reit Burg Museum, Zurich; etc.
In a very memorable performance in  Paris along with France's National symphony orchestra called the 'Orchestre National d'lle de France. And, in the year 2012, he also had the privilege to perform for the then-P.M. Dr.Manmohan Singh at Grand Hyaat, Mumbai.
 
Taking after his father, Anubrata gives great importance to imparting quality training to his students. He holds regular workshops in New York at MATRA (Music Academy for Tabla Research by Anindo Chatterjee) In the past, he has conducted numerous workshops in Japan, making many students to undertake advanced training under him. While being deeply rooted in the traditional style of playing, Anubrata also understands the need for his art to be contemporary. He actively collaborates on projects that are traditional yet new age, which especially strike a chord with the youth. Based on this thought, he formed a unique percussion group named Taal- India wherein every region of the country was represented by a percussion instrument. He has also been a part of various fusion bands and has had the opportunity to share a stage with prominent artists such as Shankar Mahadevan, Ranjit Barot, Rahim al Haj (a renowned Oud player from Iraq) etc. Currently, Anubrata has created his band named, LayaCurry and Beats & Pieces T20 of Classical Music is being appreciated all over my musicians are music lovers all over the world. His institution, Music Academy for Tabla Research by Anindo Chatterjee( MATRA) focuses on teaching the art all over the world. Anubrata has been conferred with the Basavaraj Rajguru Award in 2014 and prestigious, Sangeet Natak Akademi Yuva Award, 2016.

Awards 
 2001: President's Gold Medal awarded by All India Radio
 2002: Pandit Nikhil Ghosh Memorial Award
 2013: Basava Raj Rajguru Award conferred by Karnataka Govt.
2016: Sangeet Natak Akademi 'Ustad Bismillah Khan Yuva Puraskar.

Important festivals 
 2003:
 World Percussion Festival, Chicago
 Reit Burg Museum, Zurich
 2005:
 N.A.B.C.,  Houston
 2006:
 The  Esplanade Theatres, Singapore
 2007:
 N.A.B.C.,  Houston
 The Jerash festival,  Jordan
 Corfu festival, Greece
 Dubrovnic Festival, Croatia
 2008:
 The Carnegie Hall, Pittsburgh
 Sawai Gandharva Festival, Pune
 2009:
 N.A.B.C., Houston
 2010:
 The Kennedy Centre of Performing Arts, Washington DC
 Namaste India Festival, Japan
 Baxter Theatre Centre, Cape Town
 2011:
 Durbar Festival, London
 Saptak Festival, Ahmedabad
 Dover Lane Music Conference, Kolkata 
 2012:
 Sukiyaki Festival, Japan
 Metropolitan Museum, New York
 Darjeeling Carnival, Darjeeling
 Sawai Gandharva Festival, Pune
 2013:
 Chicago Cultural Centre,  Chicago
 Duke University, North Carolina
 Markham Centre, Toronto
 Gulbenkian Foundation,  Lisbon
 Orchestre National d'lle de France, Paris
 2014:
 Kala Ghoda Festival, Mumbai
 Sankat Mochan Festival, Varanasi
 Idea Jalsa, Chennai
 2015
 Lisbon Orchestra

References 

 The Telegraph India
 The Times of India
 The Kennedy Center Taal India Video
 The Kennedy Center
 The Deccan Herald
 The Times of India
 The Telegraph India
 The Calcutta Times
 The Times of India Classicool Project
 Mid-Day Newspaper Classicool Project
 N.A.B.C. Festival
 Encyclopedia of Percussion by John H.Beck www.books.google.com
 Bulletin of the Ramakrishna Mission Institute of Culture, Vol-57 www.books.google.co.in
 India Today, Vol-33, Issues: 27–34

Living people
1984 births
Tabla players
Indian male classical musicians
Hindustani instrumentalists
Musicians from Kolkata
Indian percussionists
Jazz fusion percussionists
21st-century drummers
21st-century male musicians
Male jazz musicians